Marta Cusidó (born 27 September 1983) is a Spanish gymnast. She competed at the 2000 Summer Olympics.

References

External links
 

1983 births
Living people
Spanish female artistic gymnasts
Olympic gymnasts of Spain
Gymnasts at the 2000 Summer Olympics
Gymnasts from Barcelona
Mediterranean Games gold medalists for Spain
Mediterranean Games medalists in gymnastics
Competitors at the 2001 Mediterranean Games
21st-century Spanish women